Dantsevka is a rural locality (a selo) in Lugovskoye Rural Settlement, Bogucharsky District, Voronezh Oblast, Russia. The population was 554 as of 2010. There are 6 streets.

Geography 
Dantsevka is located 27 km west of Boguchar (the district's administrative centre) by road. Krasnodar is the nearest rural locality.

References 

Rural localities in Bogucharsky District